Scott D. Miller is the Chairman of  consulting firm SSA & Company, LLC.  He was also a Special Advisor of General Atlantic and is a Director of AXA Financial, Inc. and MONY Life Insurance Co. of America, both of which are subsidiaries of AXA Group.

Early life
Miller obtained his Bachelor's degree in Human Biology from Stanford University and his MBA in Finance from the University of Chicago.

Past positions
He became the Executive Vice President of Hyatt Hotels Corporation in August 1997 and then served as the company's President and CEO until April 2003.  Prior to Hyatt Hotels, Miller served as Partner in the John Buck Company from 1991 to 1993.  From 1994 to 1997 he served as the Founding Partner, President, and CEO of United Infrastructure Company.

Miller's previous positions included terms on the boards of directors of Schindler Holding AG (started 2002), a director of Orbitz (started 2003), and an independent director of NAVTEQ (2004–2008), Armstrong World Industries (started 2006), and Affinion (2011–2013).

References

External links
 http://www.ssaandco.com/

American chief executives of travel and tourism industry companies
Stanford University alumni
University of Chicago Booth School of Business alumni
Living people
Year of birth missing (living people)